Body Science is an Australian owned manufacturer of Health & Wellness solutions : including "functional performance sports foods", "convenience nutrition" & "therapeutic" tablets, capsules & powders, primarily known for its association in Sports Nutrition. In 2004 the company added compression garments. Founded on the Gold Coast, Queensland in 1999. Body Science was the 1st Australian brand to work with both Informed Sport & HASTA for 3rd party testing of sports supplements for banned substances.

References

Australian brands
Australian companies established in 1999
Health care companies established in 1999
Manufacturing companies based on the Gold Coast, Queensland
Medical technology companies of Australia
Nutritional supplement companies of Australia
Sports nutrition